The Philadelphia Eagles Cheerleaders are the cheerleading squad of the Philadelphia Eagles, who plays in the NFL. The squad features 38 women. The squad debuted in 1948 as the Eaglettes, and became the Liberty Belles in the 1970s, and became the Philadelphia Eagles Cheerleaders in the 1980s. In April, the squad holds annual auditions at the Kimmel Center, with the final auditions being aired on PhiladelphiaEagles.com. The squad, was unique in that it released a swimsuit calendar, but the Eagles Cheerleaders have also released it on Android, as well as iOS for $1.99. Today, the Eagles Cheerleaders releases a booklet about the squad. The squad's director, Barbara Zaun, was a titleholder for Miss USA and Miss America, and also coordinated the Eagles Cheerleaders for Super Bowl XXXIX, the Pro Football Hall of Fame Game, as well as various photo shoots. The squad also makes off-field appearances. The squad has also made an appearance at the 2012 Senior Bowl in Mobile, Alabama.

Notable members
Beverly Lynne (1998-2000), adult film actress
Rachel Washburn (2007-2008), 1st lieutenant in United States Army

Gallery

References

10.) https://www.inquirer.com/eagles/eagles-cheerleading-first-male-kyle-tanguay-20190509.html

11.) https://www.nbcphiladelphia.com/news/sports/csn/eagles/Philadelphia-Eagles-Male-Cheerleder-509320541.html

12.) https://www.cnn.com/2013/12/22/us/cheerleader-turned-soldier-honored/index.html

13.) https://www.usatoday.com/story/sports/nfl/eagles/2013/12/19/cheerleader-rachel-washburn-army-intelligence-officer-afghanistan/4134549/

External links

 Eagles Cheerleaders official page

Philadelphia Eagles
National Football League cheerleading squads
Performing groups established in 1948
1948 establishments in Pennsylvania
History of women in Pennsylvania